3-(Trifluoromethyl)aniline is an organic compound with the formula CF3C6H4NH2. It is one of three isomers of trifluoromethylaniline.  Classified as an aromatic amines, they are colorless liquids. The corresponding dimethylamino derivative is also known.

References

Anilines
Trifluoromethyl compounds